Nisser is a lake in Nissedal, Norway. It is located in Nissedal and Kviteseid  municipality  in Vestfold og Telemark county, and is Telemark's largest lake. Part of the Arendal watershed, water enters from the discharge of Vråvatn, and its outlet is the Nisserelva river.

The Norse form of the name was Nizir - probably from an older form *Niðsær. The meaning of the name is 'the lake (sær) of the river Nið (now Nidelva (Aust-Agder))'.

Fish species in the lake include the Brown trout, European whitefish, European perch, Stickleback, and Arctic char.

The widest fjord at Lake Nisser is found immediately south of Lauvlunduten, which is situated on the border between Nissedal and Kviteseid municipalities. This is also a location where the lake resembles the sea as one can not see across the lake to the other side at this location.

The largest island in Lake Nisser is Trontveitøya. Several vacation homes are located on the island.

Fjoneferja (M/F Nissen), which connects the west- and east sides of Nisser, is the last operating cable ferry in Norway.

See also
 List of lakes in Norway

References

Lakes of Vestfold og Telemark